ʻAbd al-Ghaffār (ALA-LC romanization of ) is a male Muslim given name, and, in modern usage, surname, built from the Arabic words ʻabd and al-Ghaffār, one of the names of God in the Qur'an, which give rise to the Muslim theophoric names.

It may refer to:

People

Politicians
Khan Abdul Ghaffar Khan (1890–1988), Indian/Pakistani political and spiritual leader
Abdoel Gaffar Pringgodigdo (1904–1988), Indonesian politician
Hardan ’Abdul Ghaffar al-Tikriti, or Hardan al-Tikriti (1925–1971), Iraqi Air Force commander and politician
Rukan Razuki Abd al-Ghafar (born 1956), Iraqi politician
Abdul Ghafar Lakanwal, Afghan-American politician

Scientists
 al-Sayyid ʻAbd al-Ghaffār (born 19th century), physician and second photographer of Mecca, who worked with Christiaan Snouck Hurgronje, who – by coincidence – also used the name (Haji) Abdul Ghaffar

Sportsmen
Ramadan Yasser Abdel Ghaffar (born 1980), Egyptian boxer
Abdoul-Gafar Mamah (born 1985), Togolese footballer
Abdoul Gafar (born 1998), Burkinabé footballer
Abdul Ghaffar (cricketer) (born 1990), Pakistani cricketer

Writers
Abdul Gaffar Choudhury (born 1932/1934?), Bangladeshi writer

See also
 Gaffar

References

Arabic masculine given names